Akbarpur Inter College is a senior secondary school in Kanpur Dehat district, Uttar Pradesh, India. The school is affiliated with U P Madhyamik Shiksha Parishad. It is a government aided institution.

Location

It is situated on Akbarpur-Rura road in the town Akbarpur near famous Kalika Devi temple at a distance 300 meter from Kanpur-Agra national high way.

History
This school was founded in 1952 and got recognition for upper primary school. It is upgraded to High School in 1960 and to 10+2 classes in 1964 with faculties arts and science.

Hindi Bhawan
It is a convention center of the institution.

Transport

Rura railway station (North Central Railway) is a nearest railway station from this school at a distance 13 kilometer where fast and super fast trains are available . This school is also connected by road Rura in the north-west, Kanpur in the east.

Faculties

Humanities 
Science
Commerce

Facilities

This school has a playground,  reading room, canteen, cycle stand, laboratories for science students (Physics, Chemistry and Biology )
All the main youth functions are arranged here.

Management

President: Narendra Kumar Dwivedi
Manager : Ramakant Mishra
Secretary: Jagdish Narayan Gupta

List of Head Masters
(For UPS )
Chandrika Prasad Pandey (1952---1960)
(For High School )
Chandrika Prasad Pandey (1960–1964)

List of principals
(For Senior Secondary School)
Chandrika Prasad Pandey(1964---1981)
Dev Bansh Mishra (Off.)
Ashawani Kumar Bajpai 
Lakshmi Shankar Dwivedi (Off.)
Prakash Narayan Mishra (Off.)
Devi Ratan Tiwari (Off.)
Yagya Datta Pandey
Uma Shankar Shukla (Off.)
Tarkeshwar Mishra (Off.)
Vinod Bahadur Pandey(Off.)
Bharat Singh Kushwah (6 July 2010 – present)

Gallery

References

High schools and secondary schools in Uttar Pradesh
Intermediate colleges in Uttar Pradesh
Education in Kanpur Dehat district
Educational institutions established in 1952
1952 establishments in Uttar Pradesh